Stephen Blain Elliott (born 15 September 1958) is an English former footballer who played as a forward in the Football League during the 1970s, 1980s and 1990s.

Professional career
His opportunities at Nottingham Forest were limited and after only four League appearances in three years, he was subsequently allowed to move to Preston North End in 1979.

In five seasons at Deepdale he made 208 League appearances, scoring 70 goals, and it was this firepower that encouraged Luton manager David Pleat to invest £95,000 to bring him to Kenilworth Road in the summer of 1984.

Although scoring within three minutes of the start of his debut against Stoke City on the opening day of 1984–85, he struggled and was used in the part-exchange deal that brought David Preece to Kenilworth Road from Walsall in December 1984.

Elliott rediscovered his scoring boots at Fellows Park and after two successful years there he joined Bolton Wanderers for £25,000.

At Burnden Park though, his scoring rate slowed a little as proved by a return of 11 in 60 appearances over two seasons.

Spells at both Bury and Rochdale then followed before he dipped out of League football in 1990 to join AFC Guiseley.

Stephen was diagnosed with early onset dementia due to repeated head trauma aged 59 and is one of a number of former professional footballers currently living with the disease.

References 

English footballers
1958 births
Living people
Nottingham Forest F.C. players
Preston North End F.C. players
Luton Town F.C. players
Walsall F.C. players
Bolton Wanderers F.C. players
Bury F.C. players
Rochdale A.F.C. players
Guiseley A.F.C. players
Association football forwards
Footballers from Northumberland
People from Haltwhistle
English Football League players